Potpeće may refer to:
 Potpeće, Foča, Bosnia and Herzegovina
 Potpeće, Pljevlja, Montenegro
 Potpeće (Užice), Serbia